Sally Jane Morgan (née Milroy; born 1951) is an Australian Aboriginal author, dramatist, and artist. Her works are on display in numerous private and public collections in Australia and around the world.

Early life, education, and personal life 
Morgan was born in Perth, Western Australia in 1951 as the eldest of five children. She was raised by her mother Gladys and her maternal grandmother Daisy. Her mother, a member of the Bailgu people of the Pilbara region of Western Australia, grew up in the Parkerville Children's Home as part of the Stolen Generations. Her father, William, a plumber by trade, died after a long-term battle with post-war experience post-traumatic stress disorder. Of her siblings, Jill Milroy is an academic, Helen Milroy is a child psychiatrist who was the first indigenous Australian to become a medical doctor, David is a playwright, and William has worked as a senior public servant.

As a child, Morgan became aware that she was different from other children at her school because of her non-white physical appearance, and was frequently questioned by other students about her family background. Her mother never told her that she was Aboriginal, saying instead that she was of Indian-Bangladeshi descent. She understood from her mother that her ancestors were from the Indian sub-continent. But, when she was 15, she learned that she and her siblings were actually of Aboriginal descent.

After finishing school, she worked as a clerk in a government department, had a period of unemployment, then obtained a job as a laboratory assistant. she then attended the University of Western Australia, graduating in 1974 with a B.A. in Psychology; she followed up with post-graduate diplomas from the Western Australian Institute of Technology in Counselling Psychology, Computing, and Library Studies.

She married Paul Morgan, a teacher she had met at university, in 1972; the marriage later ended in divorce. They have three children, Ambelin, Blaze, and Ezekiel Kwaymullina, all of whom have co-authored works with Morgan.

Author 
The story of her discovery of her family's past is told in the 1987 multiple biographies My Place, which sold over half a million copies in Australia. It has also been published in Europe, Asia and the United States. It told a story that many people didn't know; of children taken from their mothers, slavery, abuse and fear because their skin was a different colour.

Sally Morgan's second book, Wanamurraganya, was a biography of her grandfather. She has also collaborated with artist and illustrator Bronwyn Bancroft on children's books, including Dan's Grandpa (1996).

Morgan is the director at the Centre for Indigenous History and the Arts at the University of Western Australia. She has received several awards: My Place won the Human Rights and Equal Opportunity Commission humanitarian award in 1987, the Western Australia Week literary award for non-fiction in 1988, and the 1990 Order of Australia Book Prize. In 1993, international art historians selected Morgan's print Outback, as one of 30 paintings and sculptures for reproduction on a stamp, celebrating the Universal Declaration of Human Rights.

Awards 
 1987 – Human Rights Literature and Other Writing Award for My Place
 1989 – Human Rights Literature and Other Writing Award for Wanamurraganya, the story of Jack McPhee
 1990 – Winner, Order of Australia Book Prize
 1993 – Joint winner Fremantle Print Award with Bevan Honey<ref name="print matters">Print Matters 30 Years of the Shell Fremantle Print Award"'  Holly Story ..et al 2005 FAC </ref>
 1998 – Notable Book, Children's Book Council
 2012 – Notable Book, Children's Book Council of Australia
 2022 – Co-Winner Picture fiction, Environment Award for Children's Literature

 Bibliography 

 Biography 
 Sally's story (Narkaling productions, 1995) edited by Barbara Ker Wilson
 My Place (Fremantle: Fremantle Arts Centre Press. 1999 – first published 1987) 
 Wanamurraganya, the story of Jack McPhee (Narkaling Productions, 1990)
 Mother and daughter: The story of Daisy and Gladys Corunna (Narkaling Productions, 1994) Edited by Barbara Ker Wilson
 Arthur Corunna's story (Narkaling Productions, 1995) edited by Barbara Ker Wilson

 Children's books 
 Little piggies (Fremantle Arts Centre Press, 1991) with Paul Morgan
 The flying emu and other Australian stories (Viking, 1992)
 Hurry up, Oscar! (Puffin Books, 1994) illustrated by Bettina Guthridge
 Pet problem (Fremantle Arts Centre Press, 1994)
 Dan's grandpa (Sandcastle, 1996)  illustrated by Bronwyn Bancroft
 In your dreams (Sandcastle Books, 1997) illustrated by Bronwyn Bancroft
 Just a little brown dog (Fremantle Arts Centre Press, 1997) illustrated by Bronwyn Bancroft
 "Where is Galah"  (Little Hare Books,  2015)
 Little Bird's Day (Magabala Books, 2019) illustrated by Johnny Warrkatja Malibirr
 The River (Magabala Books, 2021) illustrated by Johnny Warrkatja Malibirr

 Plays 
 Cruel wild woman and David Milroy (Yirra Yaakin Noongar Theatre, 1999) performed in the 1999 Festival of Perth season.

 Edited 
 Gnyung Waart Kooling Kulark (released as Going Home) (Centre for Indigenous History & the Arts, School of Indigenous Studies, University of Western Australia, 2003) co-edited with Jill Milroy and Tjalaminu Mia.
 Echoes of the past : Sister Kate's home revisited'' (Centre for Indigenous History and the Arts 2002) with Tjalaminu Mia, photography by Victor France

Art collections 
 Robert Holmes à Court collection
 Dobell Foundation
 Australian National Gallery
 Muscarelle Museum of Art

Notes 

1951 births
Living people
20th-century Australian novelists
20th-century Australian women writers
21st-century Australian women artists
21st-century Australian artists
Australian biographers
Australian memoirists
Australian women novelists
Indigenous Australian writers
Indigenous Australians from Western Australia
Writers from Perth, Western Australia
Australian Aboriginal artists
Australian printmakers
Australian women memoirists
Women biographers
Women printmakers
University of Western Australia alumni